Kieft is a Dutch surname. Kieft is a regional and/or archaic form of modern Dutch kievit (= lapwing). Notable people with the surname include:

Willem Kieft (1597–1647), Dutch merchant and director of New Netherland
Jan Jacob Kieft (1877–1946), Dutch gymnast
Ko Kieft (born 1998), American football player
Cyril Kieft (1911–2004), Welsh industrialist and racing driver
Wim Kieft (born 1962), Dutch footballer
Adam Kieft (born 1982), American football offensive lineman
Robbin Kieft (born 1987), Dutch footballer
Van de(r) Kieft:
Arjen van der Kieft (born 1985), Dutch speed skater
Fleur van de Kieft (born 1973), Dutch field hockey player
:nl:Johan van de Kieft (1884–1970), Dutch government minister

See also
 Kieft Cars, a British motorcar company founded by Cyril Kieft 
 Kieft's War, a conflict (1643–1645) between settlers of New Netherland and the native Lenape population in what is now New York

Dutch-language surnames